Sanyukta Bhatia (born 19 October 1947) is an Indian politician who was the first woman to be elected as the Mayor of Lucknow Municipal Corporation, which is one of the biggest municipal corporations in India.

References
Who is Sanyukta Bhatia? Meet Lucknow’s first woman mayor in 100 years
 
Sanyukta Bhatia(Bharatiya Janata Party(BJP)):Constituency- LUCKNOW(LUCKNOW) - Affidavit Information of Candidate:

Mayors of Lucknow
Women mayors of places in Uttar Pradesh
Living people
1947 births
People from Lucknow
Bharatiya Janata Party politicians from Uttar Pradesh
21st-century Indian politicians
21st-century Indian women politicians